Yula is a given name and surname. Notable people with the name include:

 (born 1965), Turkish writer and playwright
Selçuk Yula (1959–2013), Turkish footballer
Yula Beeri, Israeli composer, musician, and performer

See also
Jula (name)